Pamela Adie (born Biwom Pamela Adie; 15 April 1984) is a Nigerian LGBT rights activist, public speaker, screenwriter and filmmaker. Pamela is hailed as a prominent public speaker advocating LGBTQ community and has often raised her voice on empowering LGBTQ community in Nigeria. Her research and works about LGBT rights in Nigeria have featured in several LGBT anthology series. She rose to prominence with her directorial debut Under the Rainbow which reflects her personal memoir. Her production venture Ìfé is deemed as Nigeria's first lesbian film. She is the executive director of non governmental organisation Equality Hub.

Biography 
Although she was married to a man, she revealed that she is an openly lesbian in an announcement made in 2011 after discussing with her family members. She hails from Calabar, Cross River State.

Career 
Pamela pursued her MBA degree at the Webster University and completed her master's degree from the University of Baltimore. She obtained her bachelor's degree in Business administration from the University of Wisconsin-Superior. She pursued her career as an LGBT rights advocate and officially became Nigeria's first lesbian activist. She also attended the World Economic Forum in 2017 and spoke in the inaugural edition of the "Meet Leading LGBT Rights Activists". In the forum, she also addressed the importance of including LGBT people in the workplace.

She written, directed and produced Nigeria’s first lesbian-focused documentary film titled Under the Rainbow (2019) which largely focuses on her personal life. In 2019, she was nominated and shortlisted among ten nominees for the inaugural edition of the Mary Chirwa Award which was initiated in 2018. She was conferred the thine nomination in recognition of her courageous leadership.

Ìfé 

She announced her intention on making a feature film on lesbian community in Nigeria and executively produced the film Ìfé. The production of the film became controversial due to the government ban on lesbian related work. The project was initiated jointly by Uyaiedu Ikpe-Etim and Pamela Adie in collaboration with the Equality Hub. The film is regarded as Nigeria's first ever lesbian feature film and concerns on censorship also emerged due to the film genre. However the film released is delayed due to censorship issues and Pamila Adie along with film director were threatened by the authorities for possible imprisonment after allegations emerged regarding the attempt by the filmmakers on releasing the film internationally.

References 

Living people
1984 births
Nigerian activists
Nigerian women writers
Nigerian documentary filmmakers
Nigerian film producers
Nigerian screenwriters
21st-century Nigerian women
Nigerian LGBT screenwriters
Nigerian lesbian writers
Lesbian screenwriters
University of Baltimore alumni
University of Wisconsin–Superior alumni
Webster University alumni
People from Cross River State
People from Calabar